Puta falta de sacanagem is an Internet meme that appeared in Brazil in 2010. It originated from a phrase said by Georgia Massa, who was present in an autograph session of the Brazilian rock band Restart.

After the information that the event had to be cancelled, the Brazilian newspaper Folha de S.Paulo interviewed some of the angry fans, one of them being Georgia Massa. Massa, who was nervous, got confused and said the cancellation had been a "puta falta de sacanagem" (something like "fucking lack of immorality" in English).

That phrase, together with "vou xingar muito no Twitter" ("I'm going to curse a lot on Twitter"), became a popular Internet meme in Brazil and was noticed even by Restart itself, that presented a song in tribute to this episode. Afterwards, Georgia Massa and other fans who were present at the event were invited to watch a show of the band.

Puta falta de sacanagem is considered one of the reasons for the success of Restart, as well as having boosted its on-line popularity. The meme was also nominated for the 2010 MTV Video Music Brazil in the category Web Hit of the Year.

References

External links 

 Vo Xinga Mt No Twitter e Puta Falta De Sacanagem at the 

Culture in São Paulo
Internet memes introduced from Brazil
Internet memes introduced in 2010
Phrases
Viral videos